XHZR-FM is a radio station on 97.3 FM in Zaragoza, Coahuila. It is known as La Traviesa.

History
XEZR-AM 850 received its concession on April 16, 1962. It was owned by Radiodifusora del Norte, S.A. and broadcast with 1,000 watts as a daytimer. It later began nighttime broadcasts with 250 watts.

On December 17, 2008, XEZR was authorized to move to 800 kHz and increase its power to 2 kW day and night. Three years later, it was cleared to migrate to FM.

References

Radio stations in Coahuila